Pyeattville is an unincorporated community in Luce Township, Spencer County, in the U.S. state of Indiana.

History

Pyeattville contained a gristmill in the 19th century on Little Pigeon River.

Geography

References

Unincorporated communities in Spencer County, Indiana
Unincorporated communities in Indiana